Sir Hugh Inglis, 1st Baronet (30 April 1744 – 21 August 1820) was an East Indies merchant and politician.

Inglis went to the East Indies in 1762, and returned in 1775. He was chosen as a Director of the British East India Company (EIC) in 1784, where he served as deputy-chairman in 1796 to 1797 and 1799–1800 and chairman in 1797 to 1798 and 1800 to 1801. He was Chairman of Marine Society in 1798. He was appointed Colonel of the 2nd regiment of Royal East India Volunteers. In June 1801, he was created a baronet. In 1802, he was elected M. P. for Ashburton and held the seat until 1806. Inglis married Catherine Johnson in 1784. She had inherited the Milton Bryan estate, which after her death in 1792 became her husband's property.

Inglis died at his house, in Queen Anne Street, London aged 76. A monument by Chantrey was erected to his memory in Milton Bryan Church.

See also
 - an East Indiaman that made seven voyages for the EIC between 1800 and 1817.

References

External links 
 

1744 births
1820 deaths
Members of the Parliament of the United Kingdom for Ashburton
Baronets in the Baronetage of the United Kingdom
UK MPs 1802–1806
Directors of the British East India Company